Garh More also Called Heart of Jhang, is a town of Jhang District in the Punjab province of Pakistan. Garh More is situated between the District of Jhang and Layyah. Multan is 140 km away and Jhang is 75 km away from Garh More. To the east of Garh More there is the river Chenab. This area is known for its fertility and crops such as wheat, cotton, rice, corn, and various vegetables are cultivated locally. It is also a hub of the transportation business.  It is located at 30°50'0" North, 71°54'0" East.

References
 

Jhang District
Populated places in Jhang District